Taylor High School is a comprehensive public junior-senior high school serving grades seventh through twelfth in the rural community of Taylor, Arkansas, United States. Located in southern Columbia County, Taylor High School is one of three public high schools in the county and one of three high schools administered by the Emerson–Taylor-Bradley School District.

History 
Initially it was a part of the Taylor School District.  On July 1, 2004 it consolidated with the Emerson School District to form the Emerson-Taylor School District (now the Emerson-Taylor-Bradley School District).

Academics 
The assumed course of study at Taylor High School is the Smart Core curriculum developed by the Arkansas Department of Education (ADE). Students engage in regular and Advanced Placement (AP) coursework and exams to obtain at least 23 units before graduation, which is one credit more than the state standard of 22 units. Exceptional students have been recognized as National Merit Finalists and participated in Arkansas Governor's School. The school maintains a concurrent credit partnership with South Arkansas Community College, whereas students in 11th and 12th grade can attend SACC and receive high school and college credit simultaneously. Students that graduate with a 3.50 or higher grade point average (GPA) are designated Honor Graduates, with Highest Honor Graduates graduating with a 3.75 or higher GPA.

Athletics 
The Taylor High School mascot is the Tiger with blue and white serving as the school colors.

For the 2012–14 seasons, the Taylor Tigers participate in the 1A Region 7 East Conference. Competition is primarily sanctioned by the Arkansas Activities Association with the Tigers competing in golf (boys/girls), basketball (boys/girls), baseball, and softball.

References

External links 
 

Public high schools in Arkansas
Schools in Columbia County, Arkansas